Sherwin Grot (born 29 July 1990) is a Dutch footballer who plays for the NEC Amateurs in the Eerste Klasse. 

Formerly, he played on the professional level for Dutch club NEC of the Eredivisie league during the 2009–10 season and for PEC Zwolle during the 2012–13 season.

Career

Londerzeel & VV Duno
On 17 August 2019 it was announced, that Grot had signed with Belgian club SD Londerzeel. However, one week later, Grot changed his mind and returned to the Netherlands to sign with VV DUNO.

Grot later revealed, that he left Londerzeel after one week because the parties had different views on the agreements made. He explained, that it suddenly turned out that he would not get a house there, and therefore would have to drive up and down for two hours every day.

On 28 November 2019 it was confirmed, that Grot had left VV DUNO again. He moved to the NEC Amateurs, SC NEC, in February 2020.

References

External links
 Voetbal International:  

Living people
1990 births
Footballers from Arnhem
Association football forwards
Dutch footballers
Dutch expatriate footballers
Dutch sportspeople of Surinamese descent
NEC Nijmegen players
De Treffers players
PEC Zwolle players
Kozakken Boys players
IJsselmeervogels players
SV TEC players
VV DUNO players
Eredivisie players
Tweede Divisie players
Derde Divisie players
Eerste Klasse players
Dutch expatriate sportspeople in Belgium
Expatriate footballers in Belgium